The 2012 Kenyan Women's Premier League began on 3 March and ended on 23 September.  The Kenyan Women's Premier League (also known as the FKF Girls' Premier League) is the top tier women's football league in Kenya. It is controlled by the Football Kenya Federation.

Matuu clinched the title on 6 October 2012 after being awarded a walkover away at Kamaliza Eaglets, who are to be relegated at the end of the season with Sotik Super Stars. Millicent Mwanzi of third-placed Old Is Gold took the Golden Boot having scored the league best of 31 goals.

League table

Results

Top scorers

Last updated: 7 October 2012

See also
 2012 Kenyan Premier League

References

Women
Kenyan Women's Premier League seasons
2011–12 domestic women's association football leagues
2012–13 domestic women's association football leagues